Snellegem is a town in Jabbeke, Belgium.

It is located between Jabbeke and Zedelgem. It is about 8 km from the city of Bruges.

See also
West Flanders

External links
Snellegem at City Review

Populated places in West Flanders